Arash Soosarian ( born August 10, 1986) is an Iranian footballer who plays for Malavan F.C. in the IPL.

Club career
Soosarian has played his entire career with Malavan F.C.

 Assist Goals

References

1986 births
Living people
Malavan players
Iranian footballers
Association football defenders